Mauritius Lowe (1746–1793) was a British painter and engraver.

Lowe was one of the first students at the Royal Academy of Arts. While there he was awarded a gold medal, along with John Bacon and James Gandon. As a reward for his performance at the Academy, in 1771 Lowe was offered a "Traveling Studentship", a sponsorship to study art abroad for three years. His allowance was later forfeited however for misconduct. Lowe was friends with the writer and poet Samuel Johnson.

References

British engravers
1746 births
1793 deaths
Painters from London
18th-century British painters
British male painters
18th-century engravers